Cryptophagidae is a family of beetles with representatives found in all biogeographic realms. Members of this family are commonly called silken fungus beetles and both adults and larvae appear to feed exclusively on fungi although in a wide variety of habitats and situations, such as rotting wood and shed animal fur and feathers. These beetles vary from about 1 to 11 millimeters long, and usually have an oval body shape with a slight "waist".

Around 600 species have been described and are placed in about 60 genera in two subfamilies.

Subfamilies:
Atomariinae
Cryptophaginae

Genera
These 37 genera belong to the family Cryptophagidae:

 Alfieriella Wittmer, 1935 g
 Amydropa Reitter, 1877 i c g
 Anitamaria Leschen, 1996 g
 Antarcticotectus Brookes, 1951 g
 Antherophagus Dejean, 1821 i c g b
 Atomaria Stephens, 1829 i c g b
 Caenoscelis Thomson, 1863 i c g b
 Cryptophagites Ponomarenko, 1990 g
 Cryptophagus Herbst, 1792 i c g b
 Cryptothelypterus Leschen & Lawrence, 1991 g
 Curelius Casey, 1900 i c g b
 Dernostea Sasaji, 1984 g
 Ephistemus Stephens, 1829 i c g b
 Henoticus Thomson, 1868 i c g b
 Henotiderus Reitter, 1877 i c g b
 Hypocoprus Motschoulsky, 1839 g b
 Hypophagus Lyubarsky, 1989 i c g
 Meybohmia Esser, 2006 g
 Micrambe Thomson, 1863 g
 Myrmedophila Bousquet, 1989 i c b
 Nganasania Zherikhin, 1977 g
 Ootypus Ganglbauer, 1899 g
 Ostreacryptus Leschen, 2001 g
 Paramecosoma Curtis, 1833 g
 Paratomaria Leschen, 1996 g
 Parephistemus Casey, 1924 i c g
 Pseudhapalips Champion, 1913 g
 Pteryngium Reitter, 1887 i c g b
 Renodesta Caterino, Leschen & Johnson, 2008 i c g b
 Salebius Casey, 1900 i c g b
 Serratomaria Nakane & Hisamatsu, 1963 g
 Spaniophaenus Reitter, 1875 g
 Spavius Motschulsky, 1844 g
 Sternodea Reitter, 1875 i c g
 Telmatophilus Heer, 1841 i c g b
 Tisactia Casey, 1900 i c g b
 Tomarops Grouvelle, 1903 g

Data sources: i = ITIS, c = Catalogue of Life, g = GBIF, b = Bugguide.netWatson, L. and M. J. Dallwitz. 2003 onwards. Cryptophagidae. British Insects: The Families of Coleoptera. 2012 DELTA – DEscription Language for TAxonomy.

Extinct genera 

 †Lebanophytum Kirejtshuk and Azar 2008 Lebanese amber, Early Cretaceous (Barremian)
 Subfamily Atomariinae LeConte 1861
 Tribe Atomariini Le Conte 1861 
 †Nganasania Zherikhin 1977 Taimyr amber, Russia, Late Cretaceous (Santonian)
 †Shixitomaria Lyubarsky and Perkovsky 2018 Shixi Formation, China, Early Cretaceous (Albian)
 Subfamily Cryptophaginae Kirby 1837
 Tribe Cryptophagini Kirby 1837
 †Albocryptophagus Peris et al. 2017 El Soplao amber (Spanish amber), Spain, Albian
 †Ennoticus Lyubarsky and Perkovsky 2017 Taimyr amber, Russia, Santonian
 †Microticus Lyubarsky and Perkovsky 2015 Taimyr amber, Russia, Santonian
 †Spaniophagus Lyubarsky and Perkovsky 2019 Baltic amber, Russia, Eocene

References

External links
Partial species list

 
Cucujoidea families